The statue of Margaret Thatcher in the Guildhall, London, is a marble sculpture of Margaret Thatcher. It was commissioned in 1998 from the sculptor Neil Simmons by the Speaker's Advisory Committee on Works of Art; paid for by an anonymous donor, it was intended for a plinth among statues of former Prime Ministers of the United Kingdom in the Members' Lobby of the House of Commons. However as the House did not permit a statue to be erected there during its subject's lifetime, the work had been temporarily housed in Guildhall. It was unveiled there by Lady Thatcher in February 2002.

Decapitation
On 3 July 2002, theatre producer Paul Kelleher decapitated the statue while it was on display at Guildhall Art Gallery. Having unsuccessfully taken a swing at the statue with a Slazenger V600 cricket bat concealed in his trousers, Kelleher picked up a metal pole from a nearby rope cordon and used it to decapitate the £150,000 statue. After the vandalism he waited to be arrested by the police who arrived minutes later. He joked on capture: "I think it looks better like that."

Following the loss of its head, the statue was removed from display. Although it was estimated that the work could be repaired for about £10,000, statue experts worried that it would never be the same.

At his first trial, Kelleher said in his defence that the attack involved his "artistic expression and my right to interact with this broken world". The jury, despite nearly four hours of deliberation and a direction from the judge that it could decide by majority, failed to agree on whether or not he had "lawful excuse". He was retried in January 2003, found guilty of criminal damage and sentenced to three months in jail.

On 21 February 2007, a new statue of Thatcher was commissioned in 2003 from sculptor Antony Dufort and this time in tougher silicon bronze. It was erected on the reserved plinth in the Members' Lobby.  The rule against living subjects had been relaxed by this stage and Thatcher unveiled the statue. By then, the marble statue had been repaired, but it remains in Guildhall. After several years in the Guildhall Art Gallery, the statue was moved to a corridor location elsewhere in the Guildhall building.

In popular culture
  "I Did It for Alfie", a song on the 2004 album Un by Chumbawamba that was directly inspired by the incident

References

1998 sculptures
2002 crimes in the United Kingdom
Buildings and structures in the City of London
July 2002 events in the United Kingdom
Marble sculptures in the United Kingdom
Monuments and memorials in London
Monuments and memorials to women
Thatcher, Margaret
Statues in London
London, Guildhall
Vandalized works of art in the United Kingdom